The 1950 Campeonato Profesional was the third season of Colombia's top-flight football league. 16 teams compete against one another and played each weekend. The tournament was notable for being the second year of El Dorado. Deportes Caldas won the league for 1st time in its history after getting 45 points. Millonarios, the defending champion, was 2nd with 43 points.

Background 
The tournament was the second year of El Dorado. The debutants teams were Cúcuta Deportivo and Sporting de Barranquilla, while Atlético Junior, who had been replaced by Deportivo Barranquilla the previous year, returned to the tournament. On March 17, the DIMAYOR introduced new rules: All the teams had to wear jersey numbers, all grounds must be properly delimited and the length of the matches had to be respected, etc. On July 1, Huracán and América draw 6-6, being the draw with more goals in the history of the Categoría Primera A.

League system
Every team played two games against each other team, one at home and one away. Teams received two points for a win and one point for a draw. If two or more teams were tied on points, places were determined by goal difference. The team with the most points is the champion of the league.

Teams

a Municipal played its home games at Itagüí

Final standings

Results

Top goalscorers

Source: RSSSF.com Colombia 1950

References

External links 

Dimayor Official Page

Prim
Colombia
Categoría Primera A seasons